Daniel al-Kumisi (? in Damagan, Tabaristan – 946, in Jerusalem) was one of the most prominent early scholars of Karaite Judaism. He flourished at the end of the ninth or at the beginning of the tenth century. He was a native of Damagan, the capital of the province of Qumis, in the former state of Tabaristan, (present-day Semnan province of Iran), as is shown by his two surnames, the latter of which is found only in Qirqisani. His attitude to Anan ben David and his violent opposition to the Ananites (i.e., the first Karaites, Anan's followers and immediate successors) are characteristic of his place in Karaism. At first he esteemed Anan highly, calling him rosh hamaskilim ("chief of the scholars"); but later he despised him and called him rosh ha-kesilim ("chief of the fools"). Nevertheless, Daniel's opinions were respected by the Karaites.

Daniel later immigrated to Jerusalem, and founded the order of the "Mourners of Zion." He may have built the oldest Karaite Synagogue, which is located in Jerusalem. Espousing proto-Zionist views, he urged his fellow Karaites to return to Israel, and called those who opposed doing so "fools who draw the Lord's wrath" in his Epistle to the Diaspora.

As regards Daniel's theories, he denied that speculation could be regarded as a source of knowledge, and, probably in accordance with this tenet, he maintained, in opposition to Anan, the principle that the Biblical laws must not be interpreted allegorically, nor explained contrary to the simple text (see below). He evinces little regard for science, as, for instance, when he asserts that it is forbidden to determine the beginning of the new moon by calculation, after the manner of the Rabbis, because such calculations are condemned like astrology, and the practise of them is threatened with severe punishment, according to Isaiah xlvii. 13–14. Yet Daniel himself, in his commentary to Leviticus xxvi., indulges in long reflections on the theodicy and on the suffering of the pious. His conception of the angels, also, is most extraordinary. He says that wherever "mal'akhim" (angels) are mentioned in the Bible, the designation does not refer to living, speaking beings who act as messengers, but to forces of nature, as fire, fog, winds, etc., by means of which God performs His works (compare Maimonides, "Moreh," ii. 6). This may be due to the influence of the Sadducees (who also denied the existence of angels; compare Acts xxiii. 8), in view of the fact that works circulated among the earlier Karaites named after Zadok and containing Sadducee opinions.

Legal Decisions
Daniel favored a rigorous interpretation of the Torah. The following decisions of his have been preserved: It is forbidden to do any work whatever on the Shabbat (Sabbath)—even to clean the hands with powder—or to have any work done on the Sabbath by a non-Jew, whether gratuitously, or for wages or any other compensation. The burning of lights is forbidden not only on Friday evenings, but also on the evenings of the festivals. In the description in Lev. xxiii. 40 of the trees which, according to Daniel, were used in erecting the sukkah, the phrase "periez hadar" (the fruit of goodly trees) is more definitely explained by "kappot temarim" (branches of palms), the palm being distinguished for its beauty (Cant. vii. 8).

Like Anan, Benjamin al-Nahawandi, and Ishmael al-Ukbari, Daniel forbade in the Diaspora the eating of those animals that were used for sacrifice, adding to the proofs of his predecessors others drawn from Hosea ix. 4 and Isa. lxvi. 3. The prohibition contained in Exodus xxiii. 19 ("Thou shalt not seethe a kid in his mother's milk") must not be interpreted allegorically, as Anan interpreted it, but literally. The priest carried out the injunction to "wring [pinch] off the head" of the bird ("meliqah," Lev. i. 15) by cutting the head off entirely, after the slaughtering. The clean birds are not recognizable by certain signs, as the Rabbinites assert, but the names of the birds as found in the Pentateuch are decisive (and as these can not always be identified, the Karaites make the class of forbidden birds very large). Among the locusts only the four species expressly named in Lev. xi. 22 are permitted as food. It is forbidden to eat eggs because they must be considered as living things that can not be slaughtered, as is proved by Deut. xxii. 6–7, where it is permitted to take the young, but not the eggs. Of fish the eggs only are permitted; the blood is forbidden. The leper must still be considered as unclean (this, too, is directed against Anan, who had held that the laws regarding the clean and the unclean were not applicable in the Diaspora). The carcass of an animal, however, ceases to be unclean after use has been made of it in any way, as is proved by Lev. vii. 24.

Influence of Islam and Talmud
In regard to the levirate marriage Daniel agrees with Anan that "ahim," in Deut. xxv. 5, does not mean "brothers," which would violate the prohibition contained in Lev. xviii. 16, but "relations." The story of Judah and his sons (Genesis xxxviii. 8) proves nothing, because at that time the prohibition against marrying a brother's wife did not exist. The prohibition contained in Lev. xviii. 18 can not be taken literally (as the Rabbinites take it), for the wife's sister is forbidden under any circumstance, just as is the husband's brother (there is here an example of the method of analogy, "heqqesh"); it is rather the stepsister of the wife that is meant in the passage in question; e.g., the daughter of the father-in-law's wife whom the last named had by her first husband. In this case the prohibition ends with the wife's death. The daughter is not excluded from the heritage, as the Rabbinites say, although her portion is less than that of the son, being only one-third; for in the law of valuation in connection with vows (Lev. xxvii.) women were valued less than men. In conformity with this law, the mother also receives one-third. Daniel was possibly influenced here by the shariah (see Quran, sura iv. 12, 175). In other respects Daniel follows the Talmud in holding that the descendants of one entitled to a portion succeed to his entire rights; the children of the son—i.e., grandchildren—taking precedence over the daughter, their aunt. Finally, Daniel holds that responsibility for the observance of the commandments must begin not with the thirteenth, but with the twentieth year; that the New-Year begins on the tenth of Tishri, as follows from Ezek. xl. 1; and that Muslims also may act as witnesses of the new moon's appearance.

Daniel wrote several works in the Hebrew language, all of which, save for a few quotations and fragments, have been lost. There is undeniable evidence that he compiled a legal code (Sefer ha-Mitzvot or "Book of Commandments"), and a work on the rights of inheritance. The latter, against which Saadia directed his polemics, was perhaps merely a part of the code just mentioned. He also wrote commentaries to the Pentateuch, to Joshua, and to Judges, and probably to other Biblical books. They were not running commentaries, but explanations to certain passages, and contained also digressions. Words were often explained in Arabic. These commentaries, especially that to the Pentateuch, probably contained many of the decisions enumerated above.

Resources
Kohler, Kaufmann and Samuel Poznansky. "Daniel ben Moses al-Ḳumisi". Jewish Encyclopedia. Funk and Wagnalls, 1901–1906; which contains the following bibliography:
The principal source regarding Daniel and his opinions is Ḳirḳisani, sec. i., ch. i.-ii. xviii. (ed. Harkavy, p. 280, lines 8-19; 285, 19–20; 316, 14-29); sec. iii., ch. xxi.-xxiii., sec. xi., ch. xxvi.; sec. xii., ch. vii., xxxiii. (MSS. Br. Mus. Or. 2524, fols. 63–68; 2578, fols. 10-15 and 143–144;
compare Steinschneider Festschrift, pp. 199 et seq.). For the other opinions of Daniel: Hadassi, **Eshkol, 126נ, 233נ, 236ח, 240ר, 256נ, 287נ, 308ע, 316ה;
Aaron ben Elijah, Gan 'Eden, 65b, below, and 169d, below;
Bashyaẓi, Aderet, ch. ii., iii. Extracts from the, after quotations from Karaitic authors, are found in: Pinsker, Liḳḳuṭe Ḳadmoniyyot, ii. 188;
Abraham Harkavy, in Berliner's Magazin, xx. 228;
Samuel Poznanski, in Jew. Quart. Rev. viii. 683. A fragment of the commentary to Lev. i. 1-15, vi. 21-vii. 21, from the Cairo Genizah, has been published by Schechter, Saadyana, pp. 144–146 (Jew. Quart. Rev. xiv. 512; compare ib. 41,79);
another fragment, to Lev. xxv. 9-xxvi. 25, has been edited by Harkavy, in Fuchs', i. 169–173, who ascribes it to Benjamin al-Nahawandi. Daniel, however, is the author, compare Harkavy, Studien u. **Mittheil. viii. 192, and note 2; 187.
Compare also Pinsker, l.c. i. 45;
Fürst, Geschichte des Karäerthums, i. 78;
Gottlober, p. 164;
Harkavy, Ḳirḳisani, p. 271;
Poznanski in Jew. Quart. Rev. viii. 681 et seq.;
Margoliouth, ib. ix. 436, note 2.

References

Karaite rabbis
People from Semnan Province
946 deaths
Year of birth unknown
Iranian Jews
10th-century Jews